Bernardin Castanié (born in 1869 in Bozouls) was a French clergyman and bishop for the present Roman Catholic Diocese of Rarotonga, then Prefecture Apostolic of Cook and Manihiki. He was appointed bishop in 1923. He died in 1939.

References 

1869 births
1939 deaths
French Roman Catholic bishops
Roman Catholic bishops of Rarotonga